The plateau fence lizard (Sceloporus tristichus) is a species of spiny lizard in the family Phrynosomatidae.

Description 
The upper side of its body has keeled scales and there is a series of narrow dark brown cross-bands on both sides of the midline. An elongated metallic blue patch can be found on each side of the belly and each side of the throat.

Distribution 
The plateau fence lizard is generally found in central Arizona, southwestern Utah, western Colorado, and the San Luis Valley. It can also be found in parts of New Mexico and Wyoming.

Habitat 
The plateau fence lizard generally dwells in rocky and wooded areas, making use of canyon walls, boulder-strewn hillsides, fallen tree trunks, and other debris and vantage points.

Ecology 
The plateau fence lizard is inactive during cold periods and the hottest part of the day in summer.

The lizard consumes mainly insects, spiders, and other arthropods.

References

External links 
 

Lizards of North America
Sceloporus
Reptiles of the United States
Reptiles described in 1875
Taxa named by Edward Drinker Cope